Kontich FC is a Belgian women's football club from Kontich. The club colours are red and yellow. Starting in 2010 the club was a joined venture of Kontich FC and Germinal Beerschot. The next year renamed to Beerschot AD, the following year, in 2013 the club was moved to Antwerp as the new ladies department of R. Antwerp FC. As from 2014 the club was moved back again to Kontich as K. Kontich FC.

Current squad
15 January 2017

Current coaches 
  Guy Cortens T1
  Johan van Echelpoel T2/KT

History
In 2013 the women's team played as Royal Antwerp FC. The team folded after the 2013–14 BeNe League season for financial problems. They finished bottom of the table that season.

References

External links
 Royal Antwerp FC - wiki, uitslagen en stand
 Welkom op de site van K.Kontich FC Dames
 Beerschot AD
 Royal Antwerp FC Ladies Moeten blijven op de Bosuil

 

Kontich FC
Association football clubs established in 1967
1967 establishments in Belgium
BeNe League teams
Kontich
Sport in Antwerp Province
Beerschot A.C.